PHW Business School Bern is a private business University of Applied Sciences in the Swiss Plateau that can be completed with diplomas recognized by the Swiss federal government.

Organisation
The PHW Business School Bern is part of the Federal Council approved Kalaidos University of Applied Sciences.

Programs
PHW Berne offers Bachelor and Master programs as well postgraduate courses and custom business seminars.

See also
List of largest universities by enrollment in Switzerland

References

External links
 Official PHW Business School Bern website

Universities of Applied Sciences in Switzerland
Education in Bern